Harpalus rufipes is a species of ground beetle in the subfamily Harpalinae. It was described by Degeer in 1774. Harpalus rufipes is native to Europe. As a predator, Harpalus rufipes is used as a biological agent to control seed-eating pests including aphids and slugs such as Deroceras reticulatum. It has been used as a model organism to investigate the immune system of beetles, and a study has shown it is sensitive to engine oil and diesel oil.

References

rufipes
Beetles described in 1774
Taxa named by Charles De Geer
Beetles of Europe
Biological pest control beetles